Clarehaven Stables is a thoroughbred horse racing stable built next to the Bury Road in the horse racing town of Newmarket.

It was built early in the 20th century and was bought by the businessman and philanthropist Sir David Robinson in the 1960s, after which it became the base for his successful racing operation.

It is now a base to racehorse trainer John Gosden, a British flat racing Champion Trainer, who has trained Breeders' Cup Classic winner Raven's Pass, Derby and Prix de l'Arc de Triomphe winner Golden Horn, St. James's Palace Stakes winner Kingman, Dubai Sheema Classic winner Dar Re Mi, King George VI and Queen Elizabeth Stakes and Eclipse Stakes winner Nathaniel, Irish Oaks winner Great Heavens there, and many others.

References

Racing stables in Newmarket